Abbotsford South is a provincial electoral district in British Columbia, Canada, established by the Electoral Districts Act, 2008.  It came into effect in the B.C. General Election 2009.

History

Member of Legislative Assembly 

On account of the realignment of electoral boundaries, most incumbents did not represent the entirety of their listed district during the preceding legislative term. John van Dongen, British Columbia Liberal Party was initially elected during a 1995 election to the Abbotsford-Clayburn riding and has represented them until 2013.  He unsuccessfully ran for re-election in the newly created riding of Abbotsford South and lost to Darryl Plecas.

Election results 

|-

 
|NDP
|Bonnie Rai
|align="right"|4,197
|align="right"|25.65%
|align="right"|n/a

|Independent
|Tim Felger
|align="right"|334
|align="right"|2.04%
|align="right"|n/a
|- bgcolor="white"
!align="left" colspan=3|Total
!align="right"|16,360 
!align="right"|100.00%
!align="right"|
|}

References

British Columbia provincial electoral districts
Politics of Abbotsford, British Columbia
Provincial electoral districts in Greater Vancouver and the Fraser Valley